Ollie Gordon II (born January 15, 2004) is an American football running back for the Oklahoma State Cowboys.

Early years 
Gordon attended Trinity High School in Euless, Texas. While in high school Gordon was named the Fort Worth Star-Telegram 2020 Male High School Athlete of the Year. A 4 star prospect, he committed to play college football at Oklahoma State University.

College career 
After receiving limited playing time for the majority of the season, Gordon would break out for a 136-yard performance in against West Virginia in the final game of the 2022 season. For his performance against West Virginia, Gordon was named the PFF True Freshman of the Week.

References

External links 

 Oklahoma State bio

Living people
People from Fort Worth, Texas
Players of American football from Texas
American football running backs
Oklahoma State Cowboys football players
2004 births